Kristina Kanders (born 1962 in Cologne) is a German visual artist and musician.

Background 
Kristina Kanders is a daughter of German soprano Agnes Giebel.  During her school years she concentrated on painting. Only at age 20 she began playing drums. In 1987 she moved to New York City to study (1992 Bachelor of Fine Arts Degree, New School University, 1997 Master of Arts Degree, Queens College). She studied among others with Ron Carter, Jimmy Heath, Kenwood Dennard, Jojo Mayer, Bernard Purdie, Kenny Werner and Jim Hall. From 1994 to 2005 Kanders taught at New School University.

In her New York years 1987 – 2005 Kanders performed in numerous concerts, festivals and radio broadcasts in the US and Europe, among others with Cyro Baptista's Beat the Donkey, her own group Sambanditos, Kit McClure Big Band, Joe McGinty, Huevos Rancheiros, Boo Trundle, Maria Excommunikata.

2005 Kanders returned to Cologne and produced her own music. 2006–2009 she performed frequently on drums with ' Missiles Orchestra. She released two solo albums "For All People" (2008) and "Say Something" (2010) and several original music videos on YouTube.

Since 2012, the emphasis of her work has shifted entirely to visual arts.

Exhibitions and festivals 
(C = catalog) 
1988  Pori Jazz Festival with Sambanditos
1992 – 2002 Concerts with Sambanditos/NYC at Madison Square Garden, MOMA, United Nations, Lincoln Center and many more
1995 Modern Drummer Festival with Kenwood Dennard
1998 – 2002 Festivals with Cyro Baptista's Beat the Donkey, among others at Big Bang Percussion Festival in Belgium and Holland, Guimaraes Jazz Festival, Guggenheim Museum, NY Stock Exchange and many more 
2000 CYRO BAPTISTA BEAT THE DONKEY – Willisau Jazz Archive Willisau Jazz Festival with Cyro Baptista's Beat the Donkey
2009 The Dome 51, Lanxess Arena Cologne, playing drums for Emiliana Torrini
2015  Frauenmuseum Bonn, 25. Art Fair, C
2016  Frauenmuseum Bonn, Work and Women, annual exhibition, C 
2017 Die Künstler – NordArt NordArt Büdelsdorf, C 
2018  Die Große Kunstausstellung NRW, C

Discography 
 Film music for "Global Vulva", a film by artist Myriam Thyes, 2009, Düsseldorf 
 Kristina Kanders, Say Something (Bernd Gast Music, 2010), Cologne
 Kristina Kanders, For All People (Bernd Gast Music, 2008), Cologne
 Brian Woodbury – Variety Orchestra Brian Woodbury, "Variety Orchestra" (Some Phil Records, RER Megacorp, 2004), New York
 Cyro Baptista – Beat The Donkey Cyro Baptista, "Beat the Donkey" (Tzadik Records, 2002)], New York
 David Watson – Skirl David Watson "Skirl" (Avant Records, 1999,) with "Beat the Donkey", New York
 Filmmusic with the "Custard Kings" for the film "The Golden Ram" by Alain Cloarec, 1996, New York
 Boo Trundle, "Possible Bodies" (Big Deal Records, 1996), New York
 Baby Steps Joe McGinty, "Baby Steps" (Continuum Records, 1996), New York
 David McLary and Huevos Rancheros David McLary's "Huevos Rancheros" (Three Ring Records, 1996), New York

References

External links 
 Official Website
  Kunst Düsseldorf art magazine, preview of Die GROSSE NRW art exhibition 2018 in Düsseldorf
  catalogue excerpt from NordArt 2017 exhibition in Büdelsdorf
 Sehenswert auch für Hausmänner – Kaiserslautern Rheinpfalz.de – Sehenswert auch für Hausmänner, Artikel über Einzelausstellung 2017 in Kaiserslautern 
 Verschwindende Körper: Kristina Kanders stellt in der städtischen Galerie Wesseling aus Rheinischer Werbekurier – Verschwindende Körper, Artikel über Einzelausstellung 2017 in Wesseling

1962 births
Artists from Cologne
German composers
German expatriates in the United States
Living people
German drummers
German songwriters
German women singers